Walter Piemann (born 14 November 1926) is an Austrian sprint canoeist who competed in the late 1940s and early 1950s. He won two medals at the ICF Canoe Sprint World Championships with a silver (K-4 1000 m: 1948) and a bronze (K-4 10000 m: 1950). Piemann also competed at the 1948 Summer Olympics in London, finishing eighth in the K-1 1000 m and ninth in the K-2 10000 m events.

References

Walter Piemann's profile at Sports Reference.com

External links
 

1926 births
Possibly living people
Austrian male canoeists
Canoeists at the 1948 Summer Olympics
Olympic canoeists of Austria
ICF Canoe Sprint World Championships medalists in kayak